Elizabeth Bell may refer to:

 Elizabeth Bell (doctor) (1862–1934), Ireland's first woman doctor
 Elizabeth Viola Bell (1897–1990), New Zealand community leader
 Elizabeth Bell (actress) (1941–2012), British actress who played stage and screen
 Elizabeth Bell (composer) (1928–2016), founder of the New York Women Composers, Inc.
 Elizabeth "Lizzie" Bell, founder of American charity organisation Lizzie's Loot